Council of Pavia or Synod of Pavia may refer to: 

Council of Pavia (698), ended the schism of the Three Chapters in northern Italy
Council of Pavia (850), prohibited bishops from hunting
Council of Pavia (962), attended by Otto the Great
Council of Pavia (997), dealt with the illegal transfer of archbishop of Mainz and the bigamous marriage of Robert II of France
Council of Pavia (998), held by the Emperor Otto III
Council of Pavia (1018), dealt with church reform
Council of Pavia (1022), dealt with church reform
Council of Pavia (1046), held by the Henry III of Germany on his way to be crowned emperor
Council of Pavia (1160), convened by Frederick Barbarossa to end a papal schism
Council of Siena (1423–1424), which was convened at Pavia before an outbreak of plague forced it to relocate to Siena

Pavia